A type Ia sensory fiber, or a primary afferent fiber is a type of afferent nerve fiber. It is the sensory fiber of a stretch receptor called the muscle spindle found in muscles, which constantly monitors the rate at which a muscle stretch changes. The information carried by type Ia fibers contributes to the sense of proprioception.

Function of muscle spindles
For the body to keep moving properly and with finesse, the nervous system has to have a constant input of sensory data coming from areas such as the muscles and joints. In order to receive a continuous stream of sensory data, the body has developed special sensory receptors called proprioceptors.  Muscle spindles are a type of proprioceptor, and they are found inside the muscle itself. They lie parallel with the contractile fibers. This gives them the ability to monitor muscle length with precision.

Types of sensory fibers
This change in length of the spindle is transduced  (transformed into electric membrane potentials) by two types of sensory afferents, whose cell bodies are located in dorsal root ganglia located next to the spinal cord.

The two kinds of sensory fibers are different with respect to the kind of potentials they generate:

The first of the two main groups of stretch receptors wrapping the intrafusal fibers are the Ia fiber, which are the largest and fastest fibers, and they fire when the muscle is stretching. They are characterized by their rapid adaptation, because as soon as the muscle stops changing length, the Ia stop firing and adapt to the new length.  Ia fibers essentially supply proprioceptive information about the rate of change of its respective muscle: the derivative of the muscle's length (or position).

Type Ia fibers connect to both nuclear bag fibers and nuclear chain fibers. These connections are also called "annulospiral endings", deriving from the Latin word annulus which means "a ring-shaped area or structure".

Efferent innervation
In addition, the spindle also has a motor efferent innervation carried by the efferent nerve fibers of gamma motor neurons, which is used by the nervous system to modify the spindle's sensitivity.

Termination of afferents
Proprioceptive afferents send central axons through the dorsal root of spinal nerve bifurcating into ascending and descending branches, which in turn send branches to multiple spinal segments.  Some branches synapse at the dorsal horn and some at the ventral horn (where the motor neurons are) which mediate different responses including stretch reflex.  Ascending pathways to the brain have some similarities with the cutaneous afferents, but are different because the proprioceptive information also has to reach the cerebellum which controls the timings of muscle contractions for voluntary movements.

See also
 Intrafusal muscle fiber
 Type II sensory fiber
 Gamma motor neuron
 Beta motor neuron
 Proprioception
 Motor system
 Muscle
 Muscle spindle
 Reflex action

References

External links
 Lecture notes from John D.C. Lambert on neurophysiology.
 http://highered.mcgraw-hill.com/sites/0070272468/student_view0/chapter9/chapter_overview.html

Sensory systems